Kapila Chandrasena was the CEO of SriLankan Airlines until March 9, 2015,. Prior to this role, he served as the CEO of Mihin Lanka and Mobitel. He also served as the chief marketing officer of Sri Lanka Telecom. He studied at the Royal College, Colombo, and holds a Bachelor of Engineering from the University of Chicago and a Master of Business Administration from the University of Melbourne.  He and his wife are alleged to have been involved in a $2m bribe in purchasing aircraft for Sri Lankan Airlines, and subsequent money laundering by transfer to an Australian bank. In Feb 2020, a warrant was issued by the Sri Lankan Law Enforcement Authority for the arrest of him and his wife, about this deal. He was subsequently released on bail. 

The allegations have been proved in an Approved Judgement delivered on 31st Jan 2020 by the Crown Court of Southwark, in the case between Director of the Serious Fraud Office  Vs Airbus SE. The bribe of $2m has been listed as Count 2: Sri Lanka.

References

Sinhalese businesspeople
Living people
University of Illinois Chicago alumni
University of Melbourne alumni
Sri Lankan chief executives
Chief executives in the airline industry
Year of birth missing (living people)